Ueda may refer to:

Places
Ueda, Nagano, a city in Japan
Ueda Castle in Japan
Ueda Domain of Japan
Ueda Glacier in Antarctica

Other uses
Ueda (surname)
Siege of Ueda, in 1600
Ueda Electric Railway Bessho Line

See also
Ueta